Simon Sellier (born 4 January 1995 in Le Perrier) is a French former professional cyclist, who rode professionally for the  team between 2018 and 2020.

Major results

2017
 4th Overall Tour du Maroc
 4th Ghent–Wevelgem U23

References

External links

1995 births
Living people
French male cyclists